Charles Thomas Martin (2 November 1883 – 21 October 1955) was an Australian rules footballer who played for Fitzroy in the Victorian Football League (VFL).

Martin debuted in Fitzroy's round 1 match of the 1903 season against Essendon, and he played again the next week against Melbourne. Those two matches were the extent of his VFL career.

References

External links

 

1883 births
1955 deaths
Fitzroy Football Club players
Australian rules footballers from Melbourne
People from Richmond, Victoria